Jawaharlal Nehru Stadium locally known as Polo Ground is a football stadium in Shillong, Meghalaya, India. It is used mainly for football and has most notably hosted the home matches of Shillong Lajong FC in the I-League. The stadium has a seating capacity of 30,000 spectators.

History

The stadium is a two tier stadium with a roof over the main stand. An artificial turf named Astroturf is laid down in 2012. The stadium is generally hosted I-League matches. Before professional football was played in Shillong, the stadium was created for football and running use. Both sports were played at an amateur level.

In 2009 the football club known as Shillong Lajong F.C. gained promotion to the top-tier of Indian football I-League and as a result started using the Nehru Stadium as there ground. The team regularly drew 30,000 fans for the games.

After relegation the stadium was again used for Lajong games in the I-League 2nd Division for the 2011 Season Final Round. The home field advantage managed to give Lajong promotion back to the I-League and back into fully professional football.

After the 2011 I-League 2nd Division it was announced that a change needed to be done to the pitch at the Nehru Stadium. When the stadium hosted the 2011 2nd Division it drew criticism for how the pitch was very unprepared, it even drew criticism from Indian Football Captain Baichung Bhutia. On 17 August 2011 it was officially announced that the Meghalaya Government had officially given 555,000,000 for the stadium renovation and it was commenced. Due to this Lajong had to move to another stadium for there 2011–12 I-League matches.

References

External links
Stadium information 

Football venues in Meghalaya
Shillong
Sports venues in Meghalaya
Shillong Lajong FC
Year of establishment missing